Screen fade may refer to:

Screen burn-in, a disfigurement of a CRT computer display
Fade (filmmaking), also known as a fade-out